Goddamn or God damn may refer to:

 Damnation
 Goddamn EP, a 1992 EP by You Am I
 "Goddamn", a song by Hellyeah from Hellyeah
 God Damn (band), an English band
 "God Damn" (Avenged Sevenfold song)

See also
 Goddam (disambiguation)